Space Coast Junior/Senior High School is located in Brevard County, Florida, in the community of Port St. John, Florida, United States. It is part of the Brevard County School District. The school name comes from its location, on the Space Coast. The high school graduated its first class in 2006. Dual enrollment is also offered, which allows students to take college classes at Eastern Florida State College to earn college credit; some of these students receive their associate degree at the same time as their high school diploma.

In 1994 the school opened as a middle school and later became a Jr/Sr high in 2001. In 2014, it contained .

The campus shares the same design as Central Middle School, a middle school in West Melbourne, Florida.

JROTC and Academies
The school currently offers AFJROTC, a specialized program for students interested in teaching, and a program for students who are interested in engineering and drafting. It will be one of 10 other secondary schools in the nation to be the first to transition from an Air Force JROTC to a Space Force JROTC.

References

External links
Space Coast school web page

High schools in Brevard County, Florida
Public high schools in Florida
Public middle schools in Florida